Marion Wagner (born 13 August 1968) is a German footballer. She played in two matches for the Germany women's national football team from 1987 to 1988.

References

External links
 

1968 births
Living people
German women's footballers
Germany women's international footballers
Place of birth missing (living people)
Women's association footballers not categorized by position